The 1998 Oklahoma tornado outbreak was a tornado outbreak that affected the state of Oklahoma on October 4, 1998. 26 tornadoes touched down, making this event the largest autumnal tornado outbreak in state history.

Confirmed tornadoes

See also
 Tornadoes of 1998
 List of North American tornadoes and tornado outbreaks

Notes

References 

F3 tornadoes by date
Tornadoes in Oklahoma
October 1998 events in the United States
1998 in Oklahoma
F3 tornadoes by location
Tornadoes of 1998